Biting the Apple is an album led by saxophonist Dexter Gordon recorded in 1976 and released on the Danish SteepleChase label.

Reception

In his review for AllMusic, Scott Yanow said "It is highly recommended, as are all of Dexter Gordon's SteepleChase recordings from this period".

Track listing
 "Apple Jump" (Dexter Gordon) – 11:28
 "I'll Remember April" (Gene de Paul, Patricia Johnston, Don Raye) – 7:30
 "Georgia on My Mind" (Hoagy Carmichael, Stuart Gorrell) – 9:58 Bonus track on CD reissue
 "Blue Bossa" (Kenny Dorham) – 8:49 Bonus track on CD reissue
 "Skylark" (Carmichael, Johnny Mercer) – 8:36
 "A La Modal" (Gordon) – 10:05

Personnel
Dexter Gordon – tenor saxophone
Barry Harris – piano
Sam Jones – bass 
Al Foster – drums

References

1977 albums
Dexter Gordon albums
SteepleChase Records albums